Pycnoscelus is a genus of cockroaches in the family Blaberidae. There are about 15 described species in the genus Pycnoscelus.

Species
These 15 species belong to the genus Pycnoscelus:

 Pycnoscelus aurantia Hanitsch, 1935
 Pycnoscelus conferta (Walker, 1869)
 Pycnoscelus femapterus Roth, 1998
 Pycnoscelus gorochovi Anisyutkin, 2002
 Pycnoscelus indicus (Fabricius, 1775)
 Pycnoscelus janetscheki Bey-Bienko, 1968
 Pycnoscelus micropterus Hanitsch, 1931
 Pycnoscelus nigra (Brunner von Wattenwyl, 1865)
 Pycnoscelus rothi Anisyutkin, 2002
 Pycnoscelus schwendingeri Anisyutkin, 2018
 Pycnoscelus semivitreus Princis, 1967
 Pycnoscelus striatus (Kirby, 1903)
 Pycnoscelus surinamensis (Linnaeus, 1758) (Surinam cockroach)
 Pycnoscelus tenebrigera (Walker, 1868)
 Pycnoscelus vietnamensis Anisyutkin, 2002

References

Cockroaches